Lentinula raphanica is a species of agaric fungus in the family Marasmiaceae. Described as two species, Armillaria raphanica and Gymnopus alliaceus by William Alphonso Murrill in 1943, they have been moved to a single species of the genus Lentinula by Ron Petersen and J.L. Mata in 2001. It is known from subtropical Americas, where it grows on oak and other hardwood. Fruitbodies are similar in external appearance to others members of the genus Lentinula (including shiitake), being distinguished by gills and smell reminiscent of radish or alliums, especially while drying.

References

External links 

 
 Photographs on Mushroom Observer

Fungi described in 2001
Fungi of Central America
Taxa named by Ron Petersen
Marasmiaceae